Graham J. Steele (July 8, 1964, Winnipeg, Manitoba) is a Canadian lawyer, author, and former politician, having represented the constituency of Halifax Fairview in the Nova Scotia House of Assembly from 2001-2013 for the Nova Scotia New Democratic Party. In January 2021, he began service as the Information and Privacy Commissioner for Nunavut.

Early life and education
A native of Winnipeg, Steele graduated with a BA from the University of Manitoba and was recipient of the Governor General's Silver Medal.  Steele received a Rhodes Scholarship and attended St Edmund Hall, Oxford University, graduating in 1986 with a degree in philosophy, politics, and economics.  Steele moved to Halifax in fall 1986 to attend Dalhousie Law School and graduated with an LLB in 1989.

Legal career
Steele practised law with Stewart McKelvey Stirling Scales in Halifax from 1989-1993 and was General Counsel to the Nova Scotia Workers Compensation Board from 1993–1998.  Steele was Research Director for the Nova Scotia New Democratic Party's caucus office from 1998–2001.

Steele has done workshops in Montenegro, Bosnia and Herzegovina, Kosovo and the Middle East for the National Democratic Institute for International Affairs.

Political career
In 2001 Steele successfully ran for the Nova Scotia New Democratic Party nomination in the riding of Halifax Fairview. He was elected in a by-election in March 2001,  winning the seat with 58.17% of the vote.  Steele was re-elected in the 2003, (45.85%) 2006 (58.51%) and 2009 provincial elections (63.71%).

While in official opposition, Steele served as the NDP's critic for Finance, Environment, Acadian Affairs, Insurance Act, and Treasury and Policy Board.  He also served as Deputy House Leader.  During this time, Steele also served on the Select Committee on Democratic Participation and was Chair of the Public Accounts Committee.

On June 19, 2009, Steele was appointed to the Executive Council of Nova Scotia where he served as Minister of Finance as well as Minister of Acadian Affairs.  On May 30, 2012, Steele resigned from cabinet and announced that he would not be re-offering in the next election.  Steele was appointed an honorary member of the Executive Council of Nova Scotia on May 31, 2012.

Steele was re-appointed to the Executive Council of Nova Scotia on May 10, 2013 where he took over as Minister of Economic and Rural Development and Tourism, as well as Minister of African Nova Scotian Affairs following the resignation of Percy Paris.  Steele served in the Executive Council of Nova Scotia until October 22, 2013.

Life after politics
He became a broadcaster on CBC Information Morning, providing a weekly political commentary. In September 2014, he released a memoir called What I Learned About Politics: Inside the Rise — and Collapse – of Nova Scotia’s NDP Government. The book was a shortlisted nominee for the 2015 Shaughnessy Cohen Prize for Political Writing.

Steele taught at the Rowe School of Business at Dalhousie University from 2016 to 2019.

Personal life
Steele is an Esperantist, having offered part of his legislative website in Esperanto, and has commemorated Nova Scotia Esperantists in the Nova Scotia House of Assembly. He is married to Tilly Pillay and they have two children.

References

External links
Office of the Information and Privacy Commissioner of Nunavut
New Books Network audio interview with Graham Steele on his book What I learned About Politics.

Nova Scotia New Democratic Party MLAs
Lawyers in Nova Scotia
Canadian Rhodes Scholars
Alumni of St Edmund Hall, Oxford
Schulich School of Law alumni
University of Manitoba alumni
Living people
1964 births
Members of the Executive Council of Nova Scotia
Canadian Esperantists
Canadian memoirists
21st-century Canadian politicians
Esperanto in Canada